Harald Ulrik Sverdrup (15 November 1888 – 21 August 1957) was a Norwegian oceanographer and meteorologist.  
He was director of Scripps Institution of Oceanography and director of the Norwegian Polar Institute.

Background
He was born at Sogndal in Sogn og Fjordane, Norway.
He was the son of Lutheran theologian Edvard Sverdrup (1861–1923) and Maria Vollan (1865–1891). His sister  Mimi Sverdrup Lunden (1894–1955) was an educator and author. His brother Leif Sverdrup (1898–1976) was a General with the U.S. Army Corps of Engineers. His brother 
Einar Sverdrup (1895–1942) was CEO of  Store Norske Spitsbergen Kulkompani.

Sverdrup was a student  at Bergen Cathedral School in  1901  before graduating in 1906 at Kongsgård School in Stavanger.  He graduated  cand. real. in 1914 from  University of Oslo.  He studied under Vilhelm Bjerknes and earned his Dr. Philos.   at the University of Leipzig in 1917.

Career
He was the scientific director of the North Polar expedition of Roald Amundsen aboard the Maud from 1918 to 1925. His measurements of bottom depths, tidal currents, and tidal elevations on the vast shelf areas off the East Siberian Sea correctly described the propagation of tides as Poincare waves. Upon his return from this long expedition exploring the shelf seas to the north of Siberia, he became the chair in meteorology at the University of Bergen.

He was made director of California's Scripps Institution of Oceanography in 1936, initially for 3 years but the intervention of World War II meant he held the post until 1948. During 33 expeditions with the research vessel E. W. Scripps between 1938 and 1941 he produced a detailed oceanographic dataset off the coast of California. He also developed a simple theory of the general ocean circulation postulating a dynamical vorticity balance between the wind-stress curl and the meridional gradient of the Coriolis parameter, the Sverdrup balance. This balance describes wind-driven ocean gyres away from continental margins at western boundaries.

After leaving Scripps, he became director of the Norwegian Polar Institute in Oslo and continued to contribute to oceanography, ocean biology and polar research. In biological oceanography, his Critical Depth Hypothesis published in 1953 was a significant milestone in the explanation of phytoplankton spring blooms.

Sverdrup was a member of both the United States National Academy of Sciences and Norwegian Academies of Science.
He served as President of the International Association of Physical Oceanography and of the International Council for the Exploration of the Sea (ICES).
His many publications include his magnum opus The Oceans: Their Physics, Chemistry and General Biology by Sverdrup, Martin W. Johnson and Richard H. Fleming (1942, new edition 1970) which formed the basic curriculum of oceanography for the next 40 years around the world.

The Sverdrup, a unit describing the volume of water transport in ocean currents is called after Sverdrup. 1 Sv = 106 m3 per second.

Personal life
In 1928, he married Gudrun (Vaumund) Bronn  (1893–1983)  and adopted her daughter Anna Margrethe.

Honors
He was awarded the  William Bowie Medal by the American Geophysical Union,  the Alexander Agassiz Medal of the National Academy of Sciences, the Patron's Medal of the Royal Geographical Society, the  Vega Medal by the Swedish Society for Anthropology and Geography  and the Swedish Order of the Polar Star.

Legacy
Sverdrup (Sv) is used in physical oceanography as an abbreviation for a volume flux of one million cubic meters per second.

The Sverdrup Gold Medal Award was named in his honor by  the  American Meteorological Society.

Norwegian research vessel M/S H.U. Sverdrup II is named in his honor.

In 1977, the UK-APC named a series of peaks in Palmer Land, Antarctica the Sverdrup Nunataks after him.

References

Other sources

External links

Scripps Institution of Oceanography website
Harald Sverdrup Manuscripts SMC 121. Special Collections & Archives, UC San Diego Library.
H U Sverdrup II Research/Survey Vessel
 Haral Ulrik Sverdrop Writings at Dartmouth College Library

Family genealogy

1888 births
1957 deaths
People from Sogndal
University of Oslo alumni
Leipzig University alumni
Norwegian meteorologists
Norwegian oceanographers
Scripps Institution of Oceanography
Members of the Norwegian Academy of Science and Letters
Order of the Polar Star
Foreign associates of the National Academy of Sciences